Folie douce, is a French comedy film from 1951, directed by Jean-Paul Paulin, written by Marcel-Éric Grancher, starring Anne Beressy and Louis de Funès.

Cast 
 Anne Beressy : 
 Lisette Jambel : Yolande
 Marthe Mercadier : Juliette
 André Gabriello : the captain Edgar Morgan
 Frédéric Duvallès : Mr Lancer-Léger
 Pierre-Louis : Arthur
 Louis de Funès : 
 Christine Carrère
 Maxime Fabert
 Colette Régis
 Michel Nastorg
 Robert Lussac
 Suzanne Gabriello
 Robert Le Fort
 René Hell
 France Gabriel
 José Casa

References

External links 
 
 Folie douce (1951) at the Films de France

1951 films
French comedy films
1950s French-language films
French black-and-white films
1951 comedy films
1950s French films